This is a timeline of events throughout the five decade-plus history of the Western Hockey League (WHL).

1960s
1966: League began play as the Canadian Major Junior Hockey League (CMJHL) with seven teams located in Alberta and Saskatchewan: Calgary Buffaloes, Edmonton Oil Kings, Estevan Bruins, Moose Jaw Canucks, Regina Pats, Saskatoon Blades, and Weyburn Red Wings.
1967: League expands into Manitoba, changes its name to Western Canada Junior Hockey League (WCJHL). Calgary Buffaloes become the Calgary Centennials. Swift Current Broncos, Flin Flon Bombers, Winnipeg Jets and Brandon Wheat Kings join the league.
1968: League shortens its name to Western Canada Hockey League (WCHL).  
1968: Regina Pats, Weyburn Red Wings and Moose Jaw Canucks leave the league.  Remaining eight teams broken into two divisions: East (Flin Flon, Estevan, Winnipeg, Brandon); West (Edmonton, Calgary, Saskatoon, Swift Current).
1969: Champion Flin Flon Bombers was awarded the CHA "National Championship" series against Western Ontario Junior A Hockey League Champion St. Thomas Barons.  Series starred Bobby Clarke for Flin Flon and Ken Murray for St. Thomas.  The championship was not sanctioned by the CAHA and game four was forfeited during the second period by St. Thomas due to violent play.  Prior to Game 4, Flin Flon led the series 2-games-to-1.

1970s
1970: Regina Pats return, and play in the Eastern Division; Medicine Hat Tigers are granted a franchise, and play in the Western Division. 
1971: League expands into British Columbia. Estevan Bruins move to New Westminster, and play in the Western Division. Victoria Cougars, and Vancouver Nats granted franchises, both play in the Western Division. Swift Current and Saskatoon move to the Eastern Division.
1973: Vancouver Nats move to Kamloops and become the Kamloops Chiefs; Winnipeg Jets become Winnipeg Clubs. 
1974: Swift Current Broncos move to Lethbridge
1976: League expands into Oregon. Edmonton Oil Kings move to Portland and become the Portland Winter Hawks. Winnipeg Clubs become Winnipeg Monarchs.
1976: League splits into three divisions: East (Brandon, Saskatoon, Flin Flon, Regina); Central (Medicine Hat, Winnipeg, Lethbridge, Calgary); West (New Westminster, Kamloops, Portland, Victoria). 
1977: League expands into Montana and Washington. Calgary Centennials move to Billings to become the Billings Bighorns. Winnipeg Monarchs move to Calgary and become the Calgary Wranglers.  Kamloops Chiefs fold. Seattle Breakers granted a franchise and play in the Western Division. 
1978: The WCHL becomes the Western Hockey League (WHL). Flin Flon Bombers move to Edmonton to become the second incarnation of the Edmonton Oil Kings.
1979:  Edmonton Oil Kings move to Great Falls to become the Great Falls Americans; they would fold on December 16.
1979: The WHL shrinks back into two divisions: West (Portland, Victoria, Seattle, New Westminster) and East (Regina, Calgary, Medicine Hat, Billings, Brandon, Lethbridge, Saskatoon, Great Falls)

1980s
1980: Winnipeg Warriors granted a franchise and play in the East Division. Spokane Flyers granted a franchise and play in the West Division.
1981: New Westminster Bruins move to Kamloops and become the Kamloops Junior Oilers. Spokane Flyers fold on December 2.
1982: Billings Bighorns move to Nanaimo, British Columbia and become the Nanaimo Islanders. Prince Albert Raiders and Kelowna Wings are  granted franchises. Prince Albert plays in the East Division, Kelowna in the West.
1983: Nanaimo Islanders move to New Westminster and become the 2nd incarnation of the New Westminster Bruins.
1984: Winnipeg Warriors become the Moose Jaw Warriors. Kamloops Junior Oilers become the Kamloops Blazers.
1985: Kelowna Wings move to Spokane and become the Spokane Chiefs. Seattle Breakers become Seattle Thunderbirds.
1986: Lethbridge Broncos return to Swift Current.
1987: Calgary Wranglers move to Lethbridge to become the Lethbridge Hurricanes.
1988: New Westminster Bruins move to the Tri-Cities and become the Tri-City Americans.

1990s
1991: Tacoma Rockets granted a franchise and play in the Western Division.
1992: Red Deer Rebels granted a franchise and play in the Eastern Division.
1994: Victoria Cougars move to Prince George and become the  Prince George Cougars.
1995: Calgary Hitmen are granted a franchise. Tacoma Rockets move to Kelowna and become the Kelowna Rockets.
1995: WHL divides into three divisions: West (Spokane, Tri-Cities, Kelowna, Seattle, Kamloops, Portland, Prince George), Central (Swift Current, Lethbridge, Medicine Hat, Red Deer, Calgary), and East (Brandon, Prince Albert, Regina, Saskatoon, Moose Jaw). 
1996: Edmonton Ice are granted a franchise, and play in the central division. Swift Current moves to the east division.
1998: Edmonton Ice move to Cranbrook and become the Kootenay Ice.

2000s
2001: Vancouver Giants granted a franchise.
2001: WHL divides into two conferences of two divisions each: Eastern Conference: East Division (Brandon, Regina, Moose Jaw, Saskatoon, Prince Albert); Central Division (Red Deer, Swift Current, Lethbridge, Calgary, Medicine Hat); Western Conference: British Columbia Division (Kamloops, Kootenay, Prince George, Kelowna, Vancouver); United States Division (Portland, Spokane, Tri-Cities, Seattle). 
2003: Everett Silvertips are granted a franchise and play in the United States division.
2005: The Tri-City Americans' plan to move to Chilliwack is voted down by the league Board of Governors. Three weeks after the initial vote, the league grants Chilliwack an expansion team named the Chilliwack Bruins for play in the 2006–07 WHL season. The Tri-City Americans would stay put under a new ownership group led by former Tri-City and National Hockey League players Stu Barnes and Olaf Kolzig.
2005: Shaw TV Signs a TV contract to broadcast WHL games live. 
2006: Edmonton granted a conditional franchise that began play in 2007–08.  The team, named the Edmonton Oil Kings, is owned by the Edmonton Investors Group, then owner of the Edmonton Oilers.
2010: The 2010-2011 Season was the first to be featured in EA Sports NHL 11 video game including all the teams and rosters.  
2011: The Spokane Chiefs hosted the Kootenay Ice in the WHL's first ever outdoor game on January 15. 
2011: On February 21, the defending champions Calgary Hitmen hosted the oldest continually operated major-junior hockey team in the world, the Regina Pats, for an outdoor game at McMahon Stadium in conjunction with the 2011 NHL Heritage Classic. 
2011: The Chilliwack Bruins move to Victoria, becoming the Victoria Royals.
2016: The Vancouver Giants move from Vancouver to Langley and begin playing out of the Langley Events Centre. In spite of the move, the team continues to operate under the Vancouver Giants name and identity
2019: The Kootenay Ice move from Cranbrook to Winnipeg, becoming the Winnipeg Ice.

See also
 Western Hockey League

References

External links
 
 Official WHL web site
 Western Hockey League history and statistics at HockeyDB
 2005–06 WHL Guide

History
WHL history